Hogensborg is a settlement on the island of Saint Croix in the United States Virgin Islands.

History

Høgensborg was originally the name of an estate owned by the Søbøtker family. General War Commissioner Adam Levin Søbøtker was for a while the largest landowner in the Danish West Indies. his son, Johannes Søbøtker, inherited Høgensborg and Constitution Hill after his father in 1823. He introduced the first steam mill in the Danish West Indies on the plantation. He succeeded Peter von Scholten as governor of Saint Thomas and St. John in 1835.

References

Populated places in Saint Croix, U.S. Virgin Islands
Plantations in the Danish West Indies